Dietary Foods Ltd is a UK company that manufactures many food product lines including Sweet'N Low sweetener products for the EMEA, APAC and Latin America regions.

It was founded in 1971 and is located in Soham, Cambridgeshire, England.

External links
 Company Home Page

Companies based in Cambridgeshire
Food manufacturers of England
Food and drink companies established in 1971